Jeanne d'Hauteserre (born 28 July 1953) is a French politician of the Republicans (LR) who serves as the current mayor of the 8th arrondissement of Paris.

Ahead of the Republicans' 2016 presidential primary, d'Hauteserre endorsed Nicolas Sarkozy as the party's candidate for the 2017 French presidential election.

References

1953 births
Living people
Politicians from Paris
The Republicans (France) politicians
People from Haiphong
21st-century French politicians
21st-century French women politicians
French people of Chinese descent
French people of Vietnamese descent
Mayors of arrondissements of Paris
Councillors of Paris